Javaid Laghari (Urdu: جاويد لغارى; TI is a Pakistani American who has served as the Chairperson of the Higher Education Commission of Pakistan from Aug 2009 to Aug 2013 with the status of a Federal Minister.

Publications

Books
 Solomon’s Dream, Jan 2023, Amazon Publishing, ISBN 979-83-742-07-330
 Solomon's Magic, Nov 2022, Amazon Publishing, ISBN 979-83-659-20-354
 Solomon's Demon, Aug 2022, Amazon Publishing, ISBN 979-884-8052-107
 Challenges in Higher Education, June 2021, Amazon Publishing, ISBN 979-851-8200-623
 Ifrit,  January 2019, Austin Macauley, 
 Reflections on Benazir Bhutto, SZABIST Publication, February 2008.
 Leaders of Pakistan, SZABIST Publication, August 2009.
 The Wizardry of Leadership, Paramount Publishing, Sept 2011.
 Dielectric Films for High Temperature High Voltage Power Electronics, Materials for Electronic Packaging, by J. R. Laghari and edited by Deborah D. L. Chung, Butterworth Publishers, 1994.

References

External links
 Personal web page of Javed Laghari

Members of the Senate of Pakistan
Pakistan People's Party politicians
Pakistani scholars
Pakistani scientists
Pakistani aerospace engineers
Pakistani electrical engineers
Living people
University of Sindh alumni
Middle East Technical University alumni
International Centre for Synchrotron-Light for Experimental Science Applications in the Middle East people
People from Hyderabad District, Pakistan
Baloch people
Pakistani educational theorists
Year of birth missing (living people)